Marine electronics refers to electronics devices designed and classed for use in the marine environment on board ships and yachts where even a small amount of salt water can destroy some electronics devices. Therefore, the majority of these types of devices are either water resistant or waterproof.

Marine electronics devices include chartplotter, marine VHF radio, autopilot and self-steering gear, fishfinder and sonar, marine radar, GPS, fibre optic gyrocompass, satellite television, and marine fuel management.

Communication
The electronics devices communicate by using a protocol defined by National Marine Electronics Association(NMEA), with two standards available, NMEA 0183 (serial communication network) and NMEA 2000 (controller-area network based technology). There is also Lightweight Ethernet (LWE).

In recent years, the International Electrotechnical Commission (IEC) has created a new standards suite for "Digital interfaces for navigational equipment within a ship". This is known as IEC 61162 and included NMEA 0183, NMEA 2000 and LWE.

Additionally, different suppliers of marine electronics have their own communications protocol.
A+T Instruments has ESP Ethernet over Ships Power
B&G has FastNet
Furuno has NavNet ("NavNet" refers to a product family, and is not a communications protocol. Furuno uses industry standard NMEA 0183, NMEA 2000, and standard Ethernet for communications protocol in their products)
Mastervolt has CZone
Nexus has FDX
Raymarine has Seatalk / SeatalkNG
Simrad has SimNet
Stowe has Dataline

Navigation
Another important part of marine electronics is the navigation equipment. Here compasses, which includes both gyrocompasses and magnetic compasses, make up for equipment that is used by the entire shipping industry.

Industry
Some manufacturers specialize more in equipment for commercial vessels such as tankers and general cargo vessels.
This industry is relatively small with worldwide sales of $3.2 billion in 2015. The top manufacturer was Japan-based Furuno, followed closely by Norway-based Navico, a holding company for several current and former industry brands (B&G, C-MAP, Lowrance Electronics, Simrad Yachting), with revenue of $308 million. Rounding out the top five are Japan Radio Company  in third, Garmin (popular with recreational users) in fourth, and  Wärtsilä (Sam Electronics and Transas) in fifth. The next four top manufacturers are Raymarine Marine Electronics (a subsidiary of FLIR Systems), Raytheon Anschütz, Sperry Marine, and Tokyo Keiki.
|url-status=dead |archiveurl=https://web.archive.org/web/20140215150802/http://www.kh-gps.de/nmea.faq
Other companies outside of the industry's top ten that have a significant presence chartplotters include Samyung ENC, Hummingbird (Johnson Outdoors), Murphy (Enovation Controls), Naviop, SI-TEX Marine Electronics, and TwoNav.

References

External links
 National Marine Electronics Association
 Marine Electronics Journal
 Marine Electronics
 Marine Electronics and Hardware

Navigational equipment manufacturers